Gheorghe Lucian Noian (born 26 November 2004) is a Romanian professional footballer who plays as a forward for Gaz Metan Mediaș.

References

External links
 
 Lucian Noian at lpf.ro

2004 births
People from Mediaș
Living people
Romanian footballers
Romania youth international footballers
Association football forwards
Liga I players
CS Gaz Metan Mediaș players